Like So Many Things is an American web series, which airs on IFC and on IFC.com in the United States.

The dramatic web series is about an unlikely connection between two strangers in Brooklyn. After an awkward first meeting, Lucy and Karl run into each other again and begin an unlikely love affair.

The series is filmed and produced in Brooklyn by Marin Gazzaniga and Anslem Richardson.

Cast/Crew

Major Characters

Crew

Episodes

Season 1 (2009)

References

External links
Where is Lucy
Imdb

2009 American television series debuts
2000s American drama television series
American drama web series